Moses Harris may refer to:

 Moses Harris (1730–1787), an English entomologist and engraver
 Moses Harris (mountain man) (1800–1850), the American guide, scout, and trapper
 Moses Harris (soldier), the United States Army soldier and Medal of Honor recipient